Joachim Kerzel (born 10 December 1941) is a German actor and voice actor.

He has also collaborated with the German trance/techno-band E Nomine on a number of their albums.

Roles 
Pierre Arditi
Alan Bates
Bruno Cremer
Richard Harris
Dustin Hoffman
Anthony Hopkins
Dennis Hopper
Harvey Keitel
Barry Nelson
Jack Nicholson
Oliver Reed
Jean Reno
Martin Sheen
Robert Wagner
Shadow Man (Legion)
Spider-Man film series (J. Jonah Jameson)
WALL-E (AUTO)
Yu-Gi-Oh!: Duel Monsters (Narrator)

External links 
 
 

1941 births
Living people
German male voice actors
People from Zabrze
People from the Province of Upper Silesia
German male video game actors